The Rosebank oil and gas field lies west of Shetland. It is operated by Equinor; Suncor and Siccar Point Energy. The discovery well was drilled in 2004. A final investment decision for Rosebank is planned to be taken by May 2022. In 2022, Siccar Point Energy has been acquired by Ithaca Energy, a daughter company of Delek Group.

Exploration and Appraisal
Licence P.1026 covering blocks 213/26 and 213/27 was awarded to Texaco North Sea UK Co in the 19th UK offshore licensing round on June 1, 2001. The work program included a commitment to reprocess 3D seismic and to reach a decision on a 'drill or drop' well commitment within three years. In October 2001, Texaco was merged with Chevron who farmed-down its share of the licence to 40% prior to the discovery well, 213/27-1Z, being drilled in 2004. At the time of discovery the other licence owners were Statoil (30%), OMV (20%) and DONG (10%). Shortly after the discovery the four companies were granted an additional licence (P.1191) on adjacent block 205/1.

Several changes in ownership of the licence have taken place resulting in the current ownership of Equinor 40% (and operator of the licence), Suncor (40%) and Siccar Point (20%). Statoil had sold its 30% stake of the licence to OMV in 2013 prior to Equinor acquiring Chevron's 40% stake in 2019. Statoil was renamed Equinor in 2018. The licences currently cover blocks 213/26b, 213/27a and 205/1a.

A three well appraisal program commenced in October 2006 and the second well in the sequence, 205/1-1, was flowed tested at a rate of 6,000 barrels/day of good quality oil.

In oil and gas exploration it is common practice for prospects and discoveries to be named according to a theme. Texaco named the Rosebank prospect after the Scottish malt whisky Rosebank. Texaco also named other prospects in the Atlantic Margin in keeping with the theme including Lagavulin, Talisker and Lochnagar. Other naming themes in use by various operators include sea birds (Shell), Scottish mountains (BP), castles, rivers, Scottish dances and famous geologists (Conoco).

Geology
The deposit is contained in layers of Tertiary period, Palaeocene Colsay sandstone which lie between layers of basalt making use of seismic imaging difficult and expensive. It is estimated that  of oil and gas could be recovered. A deeper Cretaceous period accumulation was also encountered in some of the wells and this was named Lochnagar.

Practical considerations
Weather conditions are extremely difficult. Superstructure is designed to withstand  waves. High petroleum prices and favourable tax treatment is needed. Bringing gas to market requires finding a way to finance a pipeline which would combine production from several fields in the West of Shetland area into a gas export pipeline.
Equinor have selected FPSO Petrojarl Knarr for the development. The ship was constructed in 2014 for BG Norge.

Notes and references

External links and further reading
Map showing location of the field
UK offshore oil and gas - Energy and Climate Change Contents: 4, West of Shetland

Oil fields west of Shetland
Natural gas fields in the United Kingdom
Chevron Corporation oil and gas fields
Equinor oil and gas fields
Former Ørsted (company) oil and gas fields